Matthias Jacob (born 2 April 1960) is a former East German biathlete.

Biathlon results
All results are sourced from the International Biathlon Union.

Olympic Games
1 medal (1 bronze)

World Championships
7 medals (3 gold, 4 silver)

*During Olympic seasons competitions are only held for those events not included in the Olympic program.

Individual victories
5 victories (1 In, 4 Sp)

*Results are from UIPMB and IBU races which include the Biathlon World Cup, Biathlon World Championships and the Winter Olympic Games.

References

External links
 
 SGD Zinnwald

1960 births
Living people
People from Gotha (district)
Sportspeople from Thuringia
German male biathletes
Biathletes at the 1984 Winter Olympics
Biathletes at the 1988 Winter Olympics
Olympic biathletes of East Germany
Medalists at the 1984 Winter Olympics
Olympic medalists in biathlon
Olympic bronze medalists for East Germany
Biathlon World Championships medalists
People of the Stasi
Recipients of the Patriotic Order of Merit in silver